Mary Watts-Tobin (born 21 December 1936) is a British fencer. She competed in the women's individual and team foil events at the 1964 Summer Olympics.

References

External links
 

1936 births
Living people
British female fencers
Olympic fencers of Great Britain
Fencers at the 1964 Summer Olympics
Sportspeople from London